The 2022 Bemer Cyclassics was a road cycling one-day race that took place on 21 August 2022 in Germany. It was the 24th edition of EuroEyes Cyclassics and the 27th event of the 2022 UCI World Tour. It was won by Marco Haller in the sprint.

Teams 
All eighteen UCI WorldTeams and three UCI ProTeams made up the twenty-one teams that participated in the race.

UCI WorldTeams

 
 
 
 
 
 
 
 
 
 
 
 
 
 
 
 
 
 

UCI ProTeams

Result

References

Bemer Cyclassics
Bemer Cyclassics
Bemer Cyclassics